Giuseppe Cino, better known as Beppe Cino (born 3 February 1947), is an Italian director and screenwriter.

Life and career 
Born in Caltanissetta, Cino formed at the Centro Sperimentale di Cinematografia in Rome, graduating in 1970.  The same year he started as intense activity as documentarist and as assistant director, notably collaborating with Roberto Rossellini, Vittorio De Sica and Steno. He debuted as a director with the experimental drama Il cavaliere, la morte e il diavolo, which he also wrote and produced.

Selected filmography  
 Il cavaliere, la morte e il diavolo  (1983)
 La Casa del Buon Ritorno/ House of the Blue Shadows (1986) 
 Breath of Life (1990)
 Miracle in Palermo! (2004)

References

External links 
 

1947 births
20th-century Italian people
Italian film directors
Italian screenwriters
People from Caltanissetta
Living people
Centro Sperimentale di Cinematografia alumni
Giallo film directors
Italian male screenwriters